Sonny (aka Pony Rides) is a 2002 American crime drama film starring James Franco, Harry Dean Stanton, Brenda Blethyn, Mena Suvari and Josie Davis.  Based on a screenplay by John Carlen, the film marked the directorial debut of Nicolas Cage, who makes a cameo appearance. It was co-produced by Cage's production company Saturn Films.

Plot
Sonny (Franco) is the son of Jewel (Blethyn) who runs a small brothel in early-1980s New Orleans, Louisiana. Sonny returns home from the army, staying with his mother while waiting to start the job an army buddy of his promised him. Jewel tries to convince Sonny to come back to working for her as he had before the army, saying many of his old clients still miss him and he was the best gigolo she had ever had.

Sonny repeatedly turns her down, wanting to leave that life behind. However, the job he was promised never materializes and he is forced to return to working for his mother. Jewel had recently recruited a new girl to the brothel, Carol (Suvari), who meets Sonny and falls in love with him. They talk of getting out together.

One of Carol's clients, an older man, proposes to her. She initially declines, hoping to go away with Sonny. She and Sonny fall out as he fails to make an effort to get out of the business, instead becoming increasingly introverted and depressed, with occasional outbursts as he looks for more work. Ultimately, Carol accepts the marriage proposal, Sonny unravels as he realizes his father—upon his death—had been with Sonny his whole life but declined to reveal himself for fear of being thought a loser, and Sonny and Carol fail to live happily ever after.

Cast
 James Franco as Sonny
 Brenda Blethyn as Jewel
 Harry Dean Stanton as Henry
 Mena Suvari as Carol
 Seymour Cassel as Albert
 Josie Davis as Gretchen
 Nicolas Cage as Acid Yellow
 Brenda Vaccaro as Meg
 Marc Coppola as Jimmy at Mattie's

Reception
The film was not well received upon release, with a 22% rating on review aggregator Rotten Tomatoes based on 27 reviews. The site's consensus states: "Sonny is sunk by debuting director Nicolas Cage's evident inability to locate the heart of his movie's story—or properly modulate his cast's performances." However, Tommy Wiseau is a fan of the movie, and Franco's performance in it gave Wiseau faith in Franco's ability to portray him respectfully in The Disaster Artist.

See also

 Male prostitution in the arts
 List of directorial debuts

References

External links
 
 Sonny at Rotten Tomatoes
 

2000s English-language films
2000s American films
2002 films
2002 crime drama films
2002 directorial debut films
American crime drama films
Films directed by Nicolas Cage
Films produced by Nicolas Cage
Films scored by Clint Mansell
Films about male prostitution in the United States
Films set in New Orleans
Films set in the 1980s
Films set in 1981
Films shot in New Orleans
Saturn Films films